Harry Robertson is a Welsh painter born in Scarborough, Yorkshire, England in 1943. Elected to the Royal Cambrian Academy in 2010, Robertson is a realist who paints landscapes, mostly of Wales, as well as portraits. He serves on the Governing Council of the Royal Cambrian Society and is a member of the Wirral Society of Arts.

Personal history 
Harry Robertson was born in Scarborough, England in 1943 as the third child of a working mother who died when he was young. From the age of 11 he lived with a foster family first in Lancashire then in Manchester, England. He married Mari Robertson with whom he has a daughter, Natasha. Both Mari and Natasha are artists as well. He also has a son-in-law and two grandchildren.

Robertson worked in a variety of occupations including songwriting, music production, painting murals, and carpentry. He also spent time in education as an art instructor and ultimately as Head of School, Creative Arts Department, Tower Hamlets College.

Currently living and painting in Wales, Robertson also writes songs and plays in "The Tom, Dick and Harry Band".

Education 
1955-1962: Manchester High School of Art, Manchester England
1962-1966: Foundation Course; National Diploma in Design/Fine Art; Saint Martin's School of Art, London
1966-67: Post-Graduate Year Award; Saint Martin's School of Art, London
1967-68:  Advanced Tertiary College, Hornsey College of Art, University of London

Honours 

 2013: First Prize, North Wales Open
 2013: Selected as one of 10 artists by the Wales Art Council to depict the valleys of Wales
 2013: Maureen Hinchliffe Award, Williamson Museum
 2012, 2015: First Prize, Oil painting, Wirral Society of Arts National Open Exhibition at the Williamson Museum
 2007: Finalist, Wales Portrait Award
 2007:  Winner, 2007, North Wales Open Art Competition for amateurs and professionals

References 

Living people
1943 births
Date of birth missing (living people)
People from Scarborough, North Yorkshire
20th-century English painters
21st-century English painters
20th-century Welsh painters
20th-century British male artists
21st-century Welsh painters
21st-century Welsh male artists
21st-century English male artists
Welsh landscape painters
Alumni of Saint Martin's School of Art
Welsh portrait painters
Welsh male painters
20th-century Welsh male artists